Mill Valley High School is a high school located in Shawnee, Kansas, and operated by De Soto USD 232 public school district.  As of the 2020–2021 school year, its attendance is roughly 1,306.

Mill Valley is a member of the Kansas State High School Activities Association and offers a variety of sports programs. Athletic teams compete in the 5A division and are known as the "Jaguars". Extracurricular activities are also offered in the form of performing arts, school publications, and clubs.

History
The school began classes in 2000–01.  In 2008, the school district proposed and passed two bond issues to expand the school because of ongoing increases in attendance.  Construction on Mill Valley began in February 2009.  The construction was finished in the summer of 2010.  The second expansion of the school building follows a prior extension of the "A" hallway including the construction of a dedicated art wing. 

A second expansion occurred in 2019–20, resulting in a new theatre, fieldhouse, gym, a total of nearly 60,000 square feet of new space. These projects were completed for the 2020–21 school year at a cost of $20.3 million.

Extracurricular activities

Arts

Choral Music
Mill Valley's choral program offers a two mixed choruses, two girls groups, and a mixed ensemble. The Jag Chorale, Mill Valley's advanced mixed chorus, has sung with the Kansas City Chorale, and has received straight one ratings in Male, Female, and Mixed group performance at contest in 2013 and 2014.

Band
While no orchestral program is offered, Mill Valley has three standard bands, the Blue, Silver, and Symphonic Bands, as well as a Jazz Band. Both Blue and Silver bands have received high marks at contests in Kansas and Missouri. During the 2015–2016 school year, Mill Valley created the Symphonic Band, an audition-only ensemble for upper-level musicians. Jazz Band received high marks at the Kansas City Jazz Summit festival in 2017.

Theatre
The Mill Valley Theatre Department puts on two productions a year (usually these consist of one fall musical and one spring play), and the department also offers many stage related classes such as Drama I, Drama II, and Stagecraft.

Their 2018 student-led production of She Loves Me was the first Thespian musical produced at the school.

Academics

Debate
The Debate team was created in 2017 where Mill Valley competed against other schools for the first time.

Quiz Bowl
The Quiz Bowl Team has competed at the state level numerous times, including 2006, 2007, 2008, and 2009, and also participated in the U.S. Department of Energy National Science Bowl in Washington, D.C. in 2007 and 2009.

Robotics
The Jaguar Robotics Team, founded during the 2005–06 school year, held the Midwest FIRST Robotics Competition Winner title in 2006 and won the St. Louis Xerox Creativity Award in 2009. In the 10 years it has been a team it has competed using mostly with robots constructed from PVC piping for a lack of funding and shop. The team has gone to the FIRST Championship to compete twice on the Newton and Curie fields of the FIRST Championship held in St. Louis, Missouri at the end of April each year. In its latest year of competing in the 2013–2014 school year the team came in 6th amongst 39 teams in Searcy, Arkansas and 8th amongst 59 teams in Kansas City, Missouri with competitions held at a regional level.

Science Olympiad
The Science Olympiad team, also founded during the 2005–06 school year, competed at the state level in 2007, 2008, 2009, 2010, 2011, 2012, 2013 and 2014.

Athletics
The Jaguars are classified as a 5A school, the second-largest classification in Kansas according to the Kansas State High School Activities Association.  Mill Valley offers the following sports: Baseball, Boys' Basketball, Boys' Bowling, Boys' Football, Boys' Golf, Boys' Soccer, Boys' Tennis, Cheerleading, Cross Country, Football, Girls' Basketball, Girls' Bowling, Girls' Golf, Girls' Soccer, Girls' Tennis, Silver Stars Dance Team, Softball, Track & Field, Volleyball, Boys' Swimming, Girls' Swimming, and Wrestling.

The Mill Valley football team won the school's first state championship in 2015, defeating Bishop Carrol High School 35–14 at Pittsburg on November 28, 2015. They finished their season 12–1 and were ranked #1 in the state of Kansas for all classes, and #74 in the nation, according to MaxPreps.

Since then, the football team has added four additional titles, while the boys' basketball and wrestling programs have won their own titles, while the girls' golf, cross country teams have added the first girls' state titles in school history. In 2020, the Silver Stars Dance Team won their first state title in the inaugural KSHSAA Dance State competition. In Spring 2021, the Silver Stars won the schools first ever National title by winning the Medium Varsity Jazz division with the National Dance Alliance High School Championship.

State Championships

Publications
In addition to the Jagwire newspaper and JAG yearbook, the Mill Valley broadcast department produces a new Mill Valley Television (MVTV) episode each week. The broadcast and video productions department have won multiple awards for visual effects and overall quality.  

Both of Mill Valley's other publications, the 2006 JAG yearbook and the JagWire newspaper, won second place at the National High School Journalism convention, for best of show.

At the 2009 National High School Journalism Convention in Washington, D.C., the 2009 JAG ("Words") received the "Best of Show" award, and the JagWire received tenth place in said category for News magazine.  The 2009 JAG is also a recipient of the National Pacemaker Award, widely considered to be the "Pulitzer Prize of student journalism."

In fall of 2011, the JagWire launched the website MV News.org and publishes web exclusive content daily.  The website placed tenth in "Best of Show" for small schools in 2011.

Mill Valley journalism was named the State Champion in the Kansas Scholastic Press Association State Contest in 2013, 2014 and 2016.

See also
 List of high schools in Kansas
 List of unified school districts in Kansas

Other high schools in De Soto USD 232 school district:
 De Soto High School in De Soto

References

External links
 Mill Valley High School
 De Soto USD 232
 De Soto USD232 2008 Bond Issue
 MV News, school newspaper

Public high schools in Kansas
Schools in Johnson County, Kansas
Educational institutions established in 2000
2000 establishments in Kansas